Hommikuleht (meaning Morning Paper in English) was a newspaper published in Estonia between 1992 and 1995. Hommikuleht merged with the other newspapers Päevaleht and Rahva Hääl to form a daily named Eesti Päevaleht which was first published on 5 June 1995.

References

1992 establishments in Estonia
1995 disestablishments in Estonia
Defunct newspapers published in Estonia
Estonian-language newspapers
Publications established in 1992
Publications disestablished in 1995